David Heron Izatt (1892 – 1 July 1916) was a Scottish professional footballer who played in the Scottish League for Dunfermline Athletic as a half back.

Personal life 
Izatt was a plumber by trade. Soon after the outbreak of the First World War in August 1914, he enlisted as a private in the Royal Scots. Izatt was killed in Sausage Valley on the first day of the Somme and is commemorated on the Thiepval Memorial.

References 

Scottish footballers
1916 deaths
British Army personnel of World War I
British military personnel killed in World War I
McCrae's Battalion
1892 births
Dunfermline Athletic F.C. players
Footballers from Dunfermline
Association football wing halves
Royal Scots soldiers
Scottish Football League players